The average length of working time in different countries depends on a number of economic, social and societal factors. Another important factor is the extent to which part-time work is widespread, which is less common in developing countries. In 2017, the Southeast Asian state of Cambodia had the longest average working hours worldwide among 66 countries studied. Here, the working time per worker was around 2,456 hours per year, which is just under 47 hours per week. In Germany, on the other hand, it was just under 1,354 hours per year (26 per week and 3.7 per anniversary), which was the lowest of all the countries studied.

In most countries, the weekly working hours are decreasing with increasing prosperity and higher productivity. In Germany, for example, the average weekly working time of a person not employed in agriculture and working full-time fell by almost 40 percent between 1870 and 2010. In developed countries, the average working time is therefore usually significantly shorter than in developing countries. However, there are exceptions. These include countries such as South Korea, Singapore and Taiwan which still have comparable long working hours despite high incomes.

Our World in Data list 
The following list is the average annual working time per employed person (men and women) in hours in 2017. Data is not available for all countries of the world.

OECD list 
The following list is the average annual hours worked by participants in the labor force of the OECD member states. As of 2014, Mexico, Costa Rica and South Korea ranked first with the highest number of hours worked per year. As of 2014 Greece ranked the highest In EU with 2042 average hours per year, while Germany ranked the lowest with 1371 average hours worked respectively. Similarly, Netherlands has one of the lowest hours worked per labor participant.

See also
 List of countries by GDP (PPP)
 List of countries by GDP (nominal) per capita
 List of countries by GDP (PPP) per capita
 List of countries by Human Development Index
 List of countries by income equality
 List of countries by distribution of wealth
 Gross national income
 National wealth

References

Work–life balance
Labor hours